Dichomeris xeresella is a moth in the family Gelechiidae. It was described by Viette in 1956. It is found in Madagascar.

References

Moths described in 1956
xeresella